The Castle of Montearagón  was a fortress-monastery in Quicena, near Huesca, Aragon, Spain, built in the Romanesque style.  It is now in ruins.

In 1094 Sancho Ramirez reinforced the castle to help with the siege of the Muslim stronghold of Wasqah (Huesca); here he met his death by a stray arrow as he was reconnoitering the city's walls. The city was conquered in 1096 by Peter I of Aragon, after defeating the relief forces in the Battle of Alcoraz.

External links

Montearagón castle

Montearagon
Fortified church buildings in Spain
Huesca
Buildings and structures in the Province of Huesca
Ruined castles in Spain